Anders Kiel (born 5 January 1964) is a retired Swedish football striker.

He played for BK Häcken and GAIS before joining Norwegian team Moss FK ahead of the 1997 season. The team won promotion, and Palmquist played on the top Norwegian tier in 1998. He retired ahead of the 1999 season.

References

1964 births
Living people
Swedish footballers
GAIS players
BK Häcken players
Moss FK players
Swedish expatriate footballers
Expatriate footballers in Norway
Swedish expatriate sportspeople in Norway
Eliteserien players
Norwegian First Division players

Association football forwards